The 2020–21 season was Queen's Park's third consecutive season in Scottish League Two and their first full season as a professional football club following the repeal of their amateur status. Queen's Park also competed in the League Cup and the Scottish Cup. On 2 October 2020, the SPFL confirmed that the Scottish Challenge Cup had been cancelled for the upcoming season.

Summary
Queen's began their season on 6 October in the League Cup group stage with the League One season beginning on 17 October. On 11 January 2021, all football below the Scottish Championship was postponed due to the COVID-19 pandemic. On 29 January 2021, the suspension was extended until at least 14 February. 

On 12 January 2021, the club unveiled former Hibernian CEO Leeann Dempster as their new chief executive.

In March 2021, the Scottish Government gave permission for the league to resume. On 16 March, clubs from League 1 and 2 voted to implement for a reduced 22-game season with a league split after 18 games.

Queen's Park played their last match at Hampden on 20 March 2021, as their lease on the ground expired at the end of the month. They are due to groundshare at the Falkirk Stadium for the rest of the 2020–21 season.

Queen's Park were confirmed as champions of League Two and secured their promotion to League One on 20 April 2021 following their 0–0 draw with Elgin City.

Results and fixtures

Scottish League Two

Scottish League Cup

Group stage
Results

Scottish Cup

Player statistics

|-
|colspan="12"|Players who left the club during the 2020–21 season
|-

|}

Team Statistics

League table

Division summary

Transfers

Players in

Players out

Loans in

Loans out

See also
List of Queen's Park F.C. seasons

References

Queen's Park
Queen's Park F.C. seasons